Bossa Nova Pelos Passaros is an album by American jazz guitarist Charlie Byrd featuring tracks recorded in 1962 and  released on the Riverside label.

Reception

Allmusic awarded the album three stars stating, "Byrd was at the top of his form in those days. Unlike some of his earlier sets, these pretty and melodic recordings are very concise (lacking a sense of adventure), clocking in between one-and-a-half and three-and-a-half minutes".

Track listing
All compositions by Charlie Byrd except as indicated
 "Yvone" - 1:57     
 "Um Abraço No Bonfá (A Salute to Bonfá)" (João Gilberto) - 2:22     
 "Meditação (Meditation)" (Antonio Carlos Jobim, Newton Mendonça) - 3:12     
 "Você e Eu (You and I)" (Carlos Lyra, Vinícius de Moraes) - 2:57     
 "Coisa Mais Linda (A Most Beautiful Thing)" - 2:40     
 "O Barquinho (Little Boat)" (Ronaldo Bôscoli, Roberto Menescal) - 1:56     
 "Desafinado (Slightly Out of Tune)" (Jobim, Mendonça) - 2:31     
 "Samba Triste" (Billy Blanco, Baden Powell) - 2:02     
 "Bim-Bom" (Gilberto) - 1:51     
 "Hô-Bá-Lá-Lá" (Gilberto) - 2:14     
 "Ela Me Deixou (She Has Gone)" (Byrd, Benito DiPaula) - 2:34     
 "O Pássaro (The Bird)" - 3:11

Personnel 
Charlie Byrd - guitar
Gene Byrd - guitar (tracks 4, 10 and 12)
Keter Betts - bass 
Bill Reichenbach - drums
Earl Swope - trombone (tracks 4, 10 and 12) 
Charlie Hampton - alto saxophone, flute (tracks 4, 10 and 12) 
Willie Rodriguez - bongos (tracks 4, 10 and 12)
Orchestra conducted by Walter Raim (tracks 1, 3, 6 and 8)

References 

1962 albums
Charlie Byrd albums
Riverside Records albums